Bhoomi is a project jointly funded by the Government of India and the Government of Karnataka to digitize the paper land records and create a software mechanism to control changes to the land registry in Karnataka.  The project was designed to eliminate the long-standing problem of inefficiency and corruption in the maintenance of land records at dispersed and poorly supervised and audited block-level offices known as "taluka" offices in South India and "tehsildar" offices in North India. The project development and implementation was done by National Informatics Centre.

Many experiments with computerization have failed due to corruption and other factors.

See also
 HALRIS
 Girdawari
 Project Nemmadi

References

External links
 Government of Karnataka website on Bhoomi
 Rediff Article (10/4/2007) on Rajeev Chawla and Bhoomi

Government of Karnataka
Land management in India
E-government in India